Papa (translit. Baba) is a 2012 Egyptian drama film written by Karim Famy, directed by Akram Farid, and produced by Walid Al Kurdi for New Century Production. The film stars Ahmed El Sakka, Dorra Zarrouk, Nicole Saba and Salah Abdallah, and was first released in Egypt on 12 August 2012.

Plot
Hazem (Ahmed Al Sakka) is a successful gynaecologist who falls in love with Farida (Dorra Zarrouk) who works as an interior designer.  When they get married, Hazem discovers his inability to father children and the two seek a medical solution through in vitro fertilization…

Cast
 Ahmed El Sakka as Hazem
 Dorra Zarrouk as Farida
 Nicole Saba
 Salah Abdallah
 Edward
 Soleiman Eid
 Lotfy Labib

External links
 Baba at the Internet Movie Database
 

2012 films
Egyptian romantic comedy films
2010s Arabic-language films